So You Want to be Top? is a British children's television programme presented by Gary Wilmot. It aired for 3 series from 7 November 1983 until 17 December 1985 normally on a Friday afternoon.

Description
The show includes sketches and games that are slapstick in nature. The contestants were schoolchildren (except for series 3 - see Criticism). Much of the dialogue was pun-laden and tended to elicit groans from the audience. Scores were decided via a clapometer measuring the volume of the clapping/cheering of the children in the audience. Scores were recorded by The Gemini Twins in series 1 and Leni Harper in series 2 and 3.

One of the show's highlights was the spoof adverts for fake products used in pranks, most of them made by fictional company Top Kid.

Catchphrases
A number of catchphrases were associated with the show including:

 "So that means that the Creeps are top of being bottom and the Crawlers are bottom of being top!" (Gary Wilmot after the final scores have been announced)
 "Miss Harper - to the scoreboard, please!" (Gary Wilmot to Leni Harper - series 2 and 3) 
 "Mark 'em, top kids!" (Leni Harper when asking the audience to score the contestants on the clap-o-meter - series 2 and 3)

Production
The show was co-created by John Langdon and a 17-year-old schoolboy Ian White. The producer Judy Whitfield would later go on to produce The Tweenies.

Criticism
The programme could be seen as an inferior re-formulation of the long-running Crackerjack TV series.

In series 1 and 2 the contestants were school children with their dialogue unscripted. However the final series was more fully scripted with young actors (many from the popular children's drama of the time Grange Hill) only pretending to compete.

See also
 Crackerjack (TV series)

References

BBC children's television shows
1980s British game shows
1983 British television series debuts
1985 British television series endings
1980s British children's television series